This is a list of seasons played by Levante UD Femenino, Levante UD's women's section, in Spanish and European football, from its first appearance in the national championship as San Vicente CFF in 1994 to the latest completed season. The team first played as Levante UD in the 1998–99 season.

Summary

References

women's seasons
women
Levante Women
Levante
Association football lists by Spanish club
Women's sport-related lists